Eero Medijainen (born 1 December 1959) is an Estonian historian. He is focusing on Estonian history in 20th and 21st century and Estonian foreign politics.

Since 1991 he is teaching at Tartu University, Department of Contemporary History.

In 2001, he was awarded with Order of the White Star, V class.

Publications
1939: võimalused ja valikud. Tartu 2000
Ajaloo ja poliitika piiridel: mõtteid ja mõtisklusi. Koolibri. Tallinn 2008. ISBN 9789985020234 (in volume)
Eesti välisministeerium ja saatkonnad 1918-1940. Tartu 1997
Eesti välispoliitika Balti suund 1926-1934. Tartu 1991
Entsüklopeediaga emotsioonide vastu? - Eesti Päevaleht, 22. mai 2007  
Maailm prowintsionu peeglis: rahvusvahelised suhted ja Eesti välispoliitika karikatuuridel 1918-1940. Tartu 1998  
Optieren für Estland - eine freiwillige oder eine erzwungene Migration 1920-1923? - Estland und Russland: Aspekte der Beziehungen beider Länder. Hamburg, 2005 
Salaagent Sergius Riis Eestis. - Akadeemia 2001, nr 8  
The Republic of Estonia 1918-1940. Tallinn 2001
USA de jure tunnustusest Balti riikidele. - Akadeemia 1992, nr 10 
Raudse eesriide lõimed: propaganda, avalik arvamus ja Baltikum 1939-1944. SE & JS. Tallinn 2018. ISBN 9789949721610

References

Living people
1959 births
20th-century Estonian historians
University of Tartu alumni
Academic staff of the University of Tartu
Recipients of the Order of the White Star, 5th Class
21st-century Estonian historians